Germinal is a  of the French Navy. She is the sixth and last ship of her class, and the first French vessel named after Germinal, the seventh month of the Republican Calendar. The ship was constructed at Saint-Nazaire, France, in 1992–1993 and entered service in 1994. The frigate has served in the Mediterranean and Caribbean Seas and the Gulf of Guinea. Germinal is stationed in the Antilles (Fort-de-France) for patrol duties in the Caribbean Sea.

Design and description
The s were designed in response to a demand for a cheap warship capable of operating in low threat areas and able to perform general patrol functions. As a result, the Floréal class were constructed to mercantile standards in the areas of ammunition stowage, helicopter facilities and damage control, which significantly lowered the cost of the vessels. The Floréal class were designed for  using modular construction which shortened their building times.

Due to the frigate's broad beam, the ship is equipped with fin stabilisers.

The frigate is powered by a combined diesel and diesel (CODAD) system comprising four SEMT Pielstick 6 PA6 L280 BPC diesel engines driving two shafts each turning a LIPS controllable pitch propeller. The CODAD system is rated at  The vessel is also equipped with one  bow thruster. Due to the mercantile construction design, the four diesels are all located within one machinery room for ease of maintenance. Both diesel fuel and TR5 aviation fuel is brought aboard at a single location at the stern compared to naval-constructed vessels which sport two. The ship also has three  diesel-electric generators located just fore and aft of the machinery room.

Germinal was armed with two Exocet MM38 surface-to-surface missiles in launchers situated centrally atop the midships superstructure. However, at the end of the missile's life cycle in 2014, the launchers were removed as the French Navy did not intend to replace the capability aboard the ships. The ship also mounts one 100 mm CADAM turret with the Najir fire control system located forwards and two 20 mm modèle F2 guns situated in atop the aft superstructure. The ship is equipped with DRBV-21C (Mars) air sentry, Racal Decca RM1290 navigation and Racal Decca RM1290 landing radars along with ARBG-1A Saïgon communications intercept, CSF ARBR 16A radar intercept electronic surveillance systems and two Dagaie decoy systems. 

The frigate is equipped with a  helicopter landing pad located on the stern and a  hangar. The ship is capable of operating the embarked Eurocopter AS565 Panther up to sea state 5. The ship is capable of operating helicopters up to the size of the Eurocopter AS332 Super Puma.  The ship has a complement of 90 including the aircrew and officers and 24 marines with capacity for a further 13 personnel.

Construction and career
Germinal was ordered as part of the third pair in January 1991 from Chantiers de l'Atlantique for construction at their yard in Saint-Nazaire, France, and the keel was laid down on 17 August 1992. The frigate was built using modular construction methods, which reduced the vessel's construction time. Germinal was launched on 13 March 1993 and commissioned into the French Navy on 18 May 1994. Following sea trials, Germinal sailed for Arsenal de Lorient, Lorient where the weapons and sensors were installed and underwent further trials. The vessel is stationed in the Antilles (Fort-de-France) for patrol duties in the Caribbean Sea.

In 1997, Germinal was part of the French naval presence in the Gulf of Guinea, known as the Corymbe Mission. That year, the frigate participated in Operation Espadon, evacuating French nationals from Sierra Leone.

In January 2009, Germinal was reassigned from the UNIFIL mission along the Lebanese coast to a surveillance mission along the Gaza coast for ten days, beginning on 24 January.

The smugglers were turned over to the Colombian frigate . Then on the night of 17/18 November, while operating off the coast of Guajira Peninsula, Colombia, Germinal took part in the chase of another go-fast, seizing  of cocaine. 

In September 2017, Germinal, with sister ship , was deployed to Saint Martin after the island was hit by Hurricane Irma. Departing Saint Martin on 9 October, Germinal sailed for the Gulf of Guinea as part of the Corymbe Mission until December. In 2018, Germinal underwent a four-month overhaul at Fort-de-France. On 20 July 2018, the frigate seized 53 bundles of cocaine weighing a combined . Germinal intercepted a sailboat with two crew at sea. The crew set the sailboat on fire and jumped overboard and were collected by the frigate. Germinals crew successfully extinguished the fire aboard the sailboat and then boarded it. The frigate took the two prisoners and the sailboat back to Fort-de-France.

In 2022 the frigate operated with the amphibious assault ship  in anti-piracy operations in the Gulf of Guinea.

Citations

References
 
 
 
 

Floréal-class frigates
1993 ships